Opus 69 (69樂章) is the sixth studio album by Taiwanese singer-songwriter David Tao, released August 21, 2009.

The album was awarded one of the Top 10 Selling Mandarin Albums of the Year at the 2009 IFPI Hong Kong Album Sales Awards, presented by the Hong Kong branch of IFPI.

Track listing

References

External links
  David Tao@Gold Typhoon

2009 albums
David Tao albums
Gold Typhoon Taiwan albums